The  Asian Men's Volleyball Championship was the twelfth staging of the Asian Men's Volleyball Championship, a  biennial international volleyball tournament organised by the Asian Volleyball Confederation (AVC) with Chinese Volleyball Association (CVA). The tournament was held in Tianjin, China from 5 to 12 September 2003.

Pools composition
The teams are seeded based on their final ranking at the 2001 Asian Men's Volleyball Championship.

Preliminary round

Pool A

|}

|}

Pool B

|}

|}

Pool C

|}

|}

Pool D

|}

|}

Quarterfinals 
 The results and the points of the matches between the same teams that were already played during the preliminary round shall be taken into account for the Quarterfinals.

Pool E

|}

|}

Pool F

|}

|}

Pool G

|}

|}

Pool H

|}

|}

Final round
 The results and the points of the matches between the same teams that were already played during the previous rounds shall be taken into account for the final round.

Classification 13th–15th 

|}

|}

Classification 9th–12th 

|}

|}

Classification 5th–8th 

|}

|}

Championship

|}

|}

Final standing

Awards
MVP:  Yejju Subba Rao
Best Scorer:  Dan Howard
Best Spiker:  Yejju Subba Rao
Best Blocker:  Yejju Subba Rao
Best Server:  Zheng Liang
Best Setter:  Wang Hebing
Best Digger:  Yeo Oh-hyun
Best Receiver:  Suk Jin-wook

References
Asian Men's Continental Championship results and standings
Results

V
A
Asian men's volleyball championships
V